This is a list of VTV dramas released in 2004.

←2003 - 2004 - 2005→

VTV Tet dramas
These films air on VTV channels during Tet holiday.

VTV1

VTV3

VTV1 Weeknight Vietnamese dramas
These dramas air from 21:00 to 22:00, Monday to Friday on VTV1.

Vietnamese dramas in VTV3 nightly time slot
Starting from December 2003, Monday to Saturday night time slot for foreign dramas and Sunday night time slot for Vietnamese dramas were merged.

These dramas air every night of the week (except the occasions of special events) on VTV3. The broadcasting time usually is after the 19:00 News Report (21:00 to 22:00 on Thursday and Friday, 19:50 to 20:50 on the others).

VTV3 Cinema For Saturday Afternoon dramas
These dramas air in early Saturday afternoon on VTV3 with the duration approximately 70 minutes as a part of the program Cinema for Saturday afternoon (Vietnamese: Điện ảnh chiều thứ Bảy).

VTV3 Sunday Literature & Art dramas
These dramas air in early Sunday afternoon on VTV3 as a part of the program Sunday Literature & Art (Vietnamese: Văn nghệ Chủ Nhật).

See also
 List of dramas broadcast by Vietnam Television (VTV)
 List of dramas broadcast by Hanoi Radio Television (HanoiTV)
 List of dramas broadcast by Vietnam Digital Television (VTC)

References

External links
VTV.gov.vn – Official VTV Website 
VTV.vn – Official VTV Online Newspaper 

Vietnam Television original programming
2004 in Vietnamese television